Fahad Khaled Al-Dossari (born February 17, 1987) is a Thailand−Saudi Arabian footballer who currently plays as a striker . He was born in Thailand to an Arabic father and a Tai mother.

Career
On 10 May 2013, Al-Dossari joined Indonesian football club side Persiram Raja Ampat. He made his debut for Persiram against PSPS Pekanbaru on 26 May 2013 where he scored his first goals completing a hat-trick in a 5-0 win.

References

External links
Fahad Khaled Al-Dossari  at Liga Indonesia

1987 births
Living people
Saudi Arabian footballers
Saudi Arabian expatriate footballers
Saudi Arabian expatriate sportspeople in Indonesia
Saudi Arabian people of Thai descent
Expatriate footballers in Indonesia
Liga 1 (Indonesia) players
Persiram Raja Ampat players
Al-Faisaly FC players
Al-Qadsiah FC players
Al-Hazem F.C. players
Saudi First Division League players
Saudi Professional League players
Association football forwards
Association football midfielders